Below is a comprehensive drill and tap size chart for all drills and taps, imperial and metric, up to  in diameter.

In manufactured parts, holes with female screw threads are often needed; they accept male screws to facilitate the building and fastening of a finished assembly. One of the most common ways to produce such threaded holes is to drill a hole of appropriate size with a drill bit and then tap it with a tap. Each standard size of female screw thread has one or several corresponding drill bit sizes that are within the range of appropriate size—slightly larger than the minor diameter of the mating male thread, but smaller than its pitch and major diameters. Such an appropriately sized drill is called a tap drill for that size of thread, because it is a correct drill to be followed by the tap. Many thread sizes have several possible tap drills, because they yield threads of varying thread depth between 50% and 100%. Usually thread depths of 60% to 75% are desired.

People frequently use a chart such as this to determine the proper tap drill for a certain thread size or the proper tap for an existing hole.

Rules of thumb
Regarding the proportion of tap drill to thread major diameter, for standard V threads (ISO V thread and UTS V thread), there are several rules of thumb with strong predictive power:

 A good tap drill is 85% (± 2 pp) of major diameter for coarse threads, and 90% (± 2 pp) of major diameter for fine threads. 
 For metric V threads, the concept of major minus pitch (i.e., the major or widest diameter of the intended screw in millimeters minus the pitch of the threads of that screw in millimeters per thread) yields a good tap drill diameter. The major minus pitch technique also works for inch-based threads, but you must first calculate the pitch by converting the fraction of threads-per-inch (TPI) into a decimal. For example, a screw with a pitch of 1/20in (20 threads per inch) has a pitch of 0.050in and a in pitch (13 threads per inch) has a pitch of 0.077in.  Your result will only land near a tap drill size (not directly on one).
 For both of these rules of thumb (85%/90% and major minus pitch), the tap drill size yielded is not necessarily the only possible one, but it is a good one for general use. 
Some sizes outside that range have different ratios.

Below, these guidelines are explored with examples.

Examples
 A good tap drill is 85% (± 2 pp) of major diameter for coarse threads, and  a good tap drill is 90% (± 2 pp) of major diameter for fine threads.
 Example (inch, coarse): For size  (this is the diameter of the intended screw in fraction form)-14 (this is the number of threads per inch; 14 is considered coarse), 0.437in × 0.85 = 0.371in. Therefore, a size  screw ( ≈ 0.437) with 14 threads per inch (coarse) needs a tap drill with a diameter of about 0.371 inches.
 The drill sizes that are near this are letter U (0.368in; 84.2%), 9.5 mm (0.374in; 85.6%), and in (0.375in; 85.8%); any of these will work well. 
 Example (inch, fine): For -20 (same diameter as the previous example, but this time with 20 threads per inch, which is considered fine), 0.437in × 0.90 = 0.393in (i.e., if the threads are to be fine, then a slightly larger diameter drill bit should be used before tapping the hole for the screw). 
 The drill sizes that are near this are  (0.391in; 89.4%), 10 mm (0.393in; 90%), and letter X (0.397in; 90.8%); any of these will work well. 
 Example (metric, coarse): For M7.0×1.0 (an intended screw with a diameter of 7.0 mm and a pitch of 1 mm between each thread, which is considered coarse), 7.0mm × 0.85 = 5.95mm.
 The drill sizes that are near this are in (85%), 6.0 mm (85.7%), and 6.1 mm (87.1%); any of these will work well. 
 Example (metric, fine): For M7.0×0.5, 7.0mm × 0.90 = 6.30.
 The drill sizes that are near this are 6.3 mm (90%), in (90.7%), 6.4 mm (91.4%), and 6.5 mm (92.9%); any of these will work well. 
 For metric V threads, major minus pitch yields a good tap drill diameter. 
 Example (metric, coarse): For M7.0 × 1.0, 7.0 − 1.0 = 6.0 
 Example (metric, fine): For M7.0 × 0.5, 7.0 − 0.5 = 6.5 
 (The 85% coarse, 90% fine guideline, within its effective range, matches this in net effect) 
 The major minus pitch also works for inch-based threads, but you must first determine the pitch by looking at the number of treads per inch (TPI; for example,  = 0.050 and  ≈ 0.077), and your result will only land near a tap drill size (not directly on one). 
 Example (inch coarse): For -14, 1in ÷ 14 = 0.071in; 0.437in − 0.071in = 0.366in; 
 The drill sizes that are near this are 9.3 mm (0.366in) and letter U (0.368in). In addition, 9.5 mm (0.374in), and in (0.375in) will work well, although major minus pitch by itself does not tell you this; but the 85% ± 2 pp guideline supports it. 
 Example (inch fine): For -20, 1in ÷ 20 = 0.050in; 0.437in − 0.050in = 0.387in;
 The drill sizes that are near this are letter W (0.386in) and in (0.391in). In addition, 10 mm (0.393in), and letter X (0.397in) will work well, although major minus pitch by itself does not tell you this; but the 90% ± 2 pp guideline supports it. 
 For both of these rules of thumb (85%/90% and major minus pitch), the tap drill size yielded is not necessarily the only possible one, but it is a good one for general use. 
 Example (metric coarse): For M7.0×1.0, major minus pitch yields 6.0, but 6.1 also works well. 
 Example (metric fine): For M7.0×0.5, major minus pitch yields 6.5, which at 92.9% happens to be an example that pushes over the outer bound of the 90% ± 2 pp, but major minus pitch is still valid, although smaller drills (6.3 mm, 6.4 mm) will work well.

Chart

†If theoretical thread percentage not given, assume 75% ± 10%  Theoretical percentage of thread should not be relied upon for threads of included angles other than 60 degrees.
‡See http://www.newmantools.com/taps/micro.htm for more information.

See also

 AN thread
 British standard pipe thread
 British Association screw threads
 British Standard Whitworth
 Drill bit sizes, a similar page including center drill sizes
 ISO metric screw thread
 National pipe thread
 Taps and dies
 United States Standard thread
 Unified Thread Standard

References

External links
Tap Drill Sizes
Metric Tap Drill Sizes
Tap and drill chart
BTA Drill Tube Reference Chart

Hole making
Threading (manufacturing)
Mechanical standards